There have been four Fijian coups d'état in the past forty years:

1987 Fijian coups d'état (two)
2000 Fijian coup d'état
2006 Fijian coup d'état

See also 2009 Fijian constitutional crisis